Eatonville is a small rural settlement north of Hattiesburg, Mississippi. It is home to North Forrest High School.

North Forrest High School on Eatonville Road serves grades 7 to 12 and is the only high school in Forrest County School District. The student body is 2/3 African American and 1/5 white. The school colors are royal blue and white. In 2021 Todd Lowery was announced as the new football coach.

Clyde Kennard was from Hattiesburg and lived in Eatonville after fighting in the Korean War. He was barred from attending Mississippi Southern College (now the University of Southern Mississippi) nearby because it did not allow African American to attend.

Harold Ray Watson taught vocational agriculture at North Forrest High School in Eatonville before applying for missionary work.

R. A. Woullard preached at black churches in Eatonville and Hattiesburg.

The Eatonville Flat is a geologic feature 1 mile east of Eatonville.

See also
Forrest County Agricultural High School

References

Cities in Hattiesburg metropolitan area